Im Dong-gi (born 7 July 1971) is a South Korean weightlifter. He competed in the men's middle heavyweight event at the 1996 Summer Olympics.

References

1971 births
Living people
South Korean male weightlifters
Olympic weightlifters of South Korea
Weightlifters at the 1996 Summer Olympics
Place of birth missing (living people)
20th-century South Korean people